The 49er Fire was a large and destructive wildfire in September 1988 in the U.S. state of California's Nevada County and Yuba County. After igniting on the morning of September 11, when a homeless schizophrenic man accidentally set brush alight by burning toilet paper, the fire burned 33,700 acres throughout the foothills of the Sierra Nevada, impinging on the communities of Lake Wildwood, Rough and Ready, and Smartsville, before being declared contained on September 16. Driven by severe drought conditions and strong, dry winds, firefighting crews were hard-pressed to stop the fire's advance until winds calmed and humidity levels recovered. 

The 49er Fire destroyed 312 structures, including more than 140 homes, making it the most destructive wildfire in Nevada County's history and—at the time—one of the five most destructive wildfires in recorded California history. It was also the seventh most expensive California wildfire in terms of losses, which amounted to approximately $23 million. The fire highlighted the rapid pace and potential consequences of development in the wildland-urban interface, or WUI, along with several other fires in that time period, such as the Oakland firestorm of 1991 and the Fountain Fire in 1992. The 49er Fire was sometimes called the "wildfire of the 1990s" by officials in attempts to raise awareness of the growing challenges of firefighting in areas where human structures are intermingled with wildland fuels.

Background factors 
The morning of September 11, 1988, was a dangerous time for a new wildfire to ignite given long-term climatic conditions, short term weather patterns, and a patchwork of ready-to-burn development intermingled with vegetation. Northern California was entering a major drought and was being visited by a two-day episode of windy and dry weather, factors which combined to enable rapid spread and extreme burning conditions for the 49er Fire.

WUI development 
The 49er Fire began and spread through the heavily populated foothills of the Sierra Nevada in Nevada County and a small portion of Yuba County. This wildland–urban interface area, located northeast of Sacramento and at the time one of the fastest-growing areas in California, contained many houses that were difficult to protect from wildfires and some fire officials argued that they were less able to fight the fire because of the time and resources spent on defending the buildings in its path. In the first several hundred acres of the fire, firefighters were forced to defend 55 different structures.

Many homes lay at the end of narrow and unmarked roads, on or near steep hillsides, and adjacent to heavy vegetation; according to the Nevada Fire Safe Council, 80% of the destroyed residences lacked required brush clearance. Wooden shingle (often called "shake") roofs and siding were also plentiful on structures and receptive to fire spread during the 49er Fire. Nevada County had already banned such roofs in new construction, but the ban did not apply to existing structures and a Cal Fire official estimated that 30% of older homes there still had them. The chief ranger for the Nevada-Yuba-Placer Fire Ranger District also blamed the lax land planning that allowed 'Class K' construction without plumbing or electricity in Nevada County, beginning decades before the 49er Fire.

Long-term drought 

1988 marked almost two years that California had been dogged by drought, which eventually spread throughout much of North America in one of the United States' costliest recorded disasters. The drought had begun in water year 1987 (in the United States, a water year begins in October of the preceding calendar year, i.e. 1986, and runs until September 30) and it continued all the way through water year 1992 in California. During this period, California recorded multiple severe wildfire seasons, with 1987, 1988, and 1990 all among the worst yet recorded in the state by acreage burned. This was partly because the drought greatly increased tree mortality in forests, destroying at least 18 billion board feet of timber between its onset and its cessation. In 1988, at least 12 California counties declared local drought emergencies, primarily in central and northern parts of the state.

Critical fire weather 
The weather conditions before and during the 49er Fire's development were characteristic of a critical fire weather pattern for Northern California. A strong upper-level trough moved east from eastern Washington and Idaho as an upper-level ridge built offshore in the Pacific. Meanwhile, a jet on the western side of the trough brought cross-mountain flow with a sinking motion out of the northeast in Northern California. These ingredients created strong northeast downslope winds (known as Foehn winds) on the western slopes of the Sierra Nevada, with accompanying low relative humidity levels. These winds blew at up to 40 miles per hour on September 11 and 12.

Fire progression

September 11 
On the morning of September 11, 1988, at approximately 9:00 a.m., the 49er Fire was accidentally begun by Gary Wayne Parris, a homeless man suffering from undiagnosed schizophrenia. Parris was using an abandoned shack—lacking electricity or running water—for shelter on Birchville Road, just off of Highway 49. Seeking to dispose of torn strips of paper grocery bags that he had used as toilet paper, Parris set fire to the strips outside with a cigarette lighter. Almost immediately, gusts of wind blew the burning paper into nearby brush, which quickly ignited. Parris sought to put out the fire by obtaining water from a nearby pond with buckets. He was unsuccessful, and stopped nearby motorists on Highway 49, admitting to having burned the toilet paper and asking them to call the fire department. One of the motorists tried to scrape a crude firebreak with a shovel, but failed. At the same time, a fire crew from Columbia Hill Forest Fire Station spotted the smoke on their way back from another incident, also attempted to extinguish the fire, and also failed.

Within ten minutes of the first report, Cal Fire air tankers were on the scene attacking the blaze. Fire engines were there within 50 minutes. Multiple newspapers report that a second fire was then spotted from the Oregon Peak fire lookout—this one too on the north side of Birchville Road, but a mile southwest of Parris's fire and close to the Pine Grove Reservoir. The second fire grew rapidly and the two soon merged. Whether this second fire was a spot fire of the original, caused by downed or arcing power lines, or the result of a separate ignition, remains unknown.

By 10:00 a.m., the fire had burned 20 to 40 acres, and by 11:00 a.m., it had burned 100. The fire crossed the South Yuba River around 1:00 p.m. 45 minutes later, structures were burning on Owl Creek Road and McKitrick Ranch Road, and evacuations had begun for other neighborhoods between the South Yuba River and Lake Wildwood to the southwest. Winds continued to blow at 40-45 miles per hour, driving rapid fire growth: at the peak of the 49er Fire's spread, it was burning more than 1,000 acres an hour, with wind-blown ember spotting of more than half a mile. Flame heights exceeded 200 feet.

Lake Wildwood was evacuated in the afternoon. That night, many residents stayed and attempted to save their houses themselves, often fighting along firefighters and with varying levels of success. Many houses went up in flames despite the best efforts of residents armed with garden hoses, attempting to beat back encroaching 200-foot crown fires. A group of 40 firefighters was burned over by flames and forced to deploy their fire shelters after the wind shifted, though all avoided injury. Elsewhere, a dozer was engulfed in flames, forcing its operator to seek refuge beneath it while wrapping himself in an asbestos blanket. By 6:00 p.m., 4,000 acres had burned.

September 12 
Still driven by high winds and spreading rapidly, the 49er Fire crossed Highway 20 at 9:30 a.m. on September 12, dashing the hopes of fire officials who had hoped to hold the fire there. By noon, it had burned at least 12,000 acres. The fire moved down Deer Creek Canyon towards Rough and Ready, and at 3:15 p.m., Nevada County Sheriff deputies ordered the complete and final evacuation of the town. Lake Wildwood residents, who had briefly been allowed to return, re-evacuated, this time joining Penn Valley and Yuba County's Smartsville on the list of evacuated communities. The fire was 40% contained by nighttime.

September 13 and beyond 
On September 13, the weather changed in favor of firefighting efforts. Winds calmed down to 5-7 miles per hour, temperatures dropped by 10 degrees, and the relative humidity doubled. An inversion layer kept smoke trapped near the surface, grounding air tankers and limiting visibility in Rough and Ready to under 3 miles but also quelling fire activity. Evacuation orders for multiple communities, including Rough and Ready and Penn Valley, were lifted, and Highways 20 and 49 reopened. The fire still remained active: it threatened the Grass Valley Group industrial complex, moved into the Jones Bar area near the Yuba River, and burned into grasslands around Beale Air Force Base before it was extinguished four miles from the main part of the base, but no structures were lost after the night of September 12. Firefighters worried about the remaining un-contained portion of the fire in the Rush Creek drainage, south of the Yuba River and northwest of Grass Valley and Nevada City, but despite occasional spot fires a combination of hand crews and helicopters kept the fire from escaping. The night of September 13 brought higher humidity levels and relief from the winds. 

On September 14, part of the fire's eastern flank moved towards Nevada City near Jones Bar Road but was halted by fire crews. That day, the fire was declared 90% contained. The fire was declared 100% contained on September 15, at 6:00 a.m, and Cal Fire announced that the fire was completely controlled on September 16, at 8:30 p.m., 5 days after it had ignited. In total, more than 8,000 people had been evacuated in the communities of Rough and Ready, Cement Hill, Lake Wildwood, and Penn Valley. At peak staffing, at least 2,700 firefighters had fought the 49er Fire.

Impacts

Casualties 
The fire caused no fatalities. The most serious injuries were sustained by two firefighters—Rene Ruiz and Larry Lindbloom—as they attempted to defend a home in the Wildwood Heights subdivision. Their fire engine was burned over, destroying both it and the home in question, while sending the pair to the hospital via helicopter with 2nd and 3rd degree leg burns. Both were released within 24 hours. More than 500 firefighters sustained injuries.

Damage 
The fire burned 33,700 acres and destroyed 312 structures. When it occurred, it was the 7th most expensive (in terms of losses) and 5th most destructive wildfire in recorded California history, though it has since fallen well out of the top 20 destructive fires. It remains the most destructive wildfire in Nevada County history. The number of the destroyed structures that were homes is unclear; the Nevada Fire Safe Council reported it as 148. Meanwhile, the Red Cross estimate of houses burned reached 190, including 23 mobile homes. According to the Red Cross, another 17 dwellings sustained damage. Dozens of vehicles and multiple boats were also destroyed. The fire threatened—but did not burn—the Woods Crossing bridge, built in 1862 and reportedly the longest single-span covered bridge in the United States.

Political and economic 
As the fire burned, Governor of California George Deukmejian declared a state of emergency in Nevada and Yuba counties. President Ronald Reagan did the same for the two counties on September 29, allowing them to access millions of dollars in federal relief. The Yuba County Board of Supervisors also declared a local emergency. In 1989, the California State Assembly passed AB 3, a disaster relief bill to provide money to supplement federal funds for individual and family claims. After the fire, the Small Business Administration approved almost $1.7 million in home, property, and business loans. The state Department of Social Services provided another $174,000 in grants for recovery. Jerry Partain, then the director of Cal Fire, reported that damages amounted to $23 million, and fire suppression costs to an additional $6.1 million. In the weeks after the fire, tourists canceled hotel reservations in Nevada City and Grass Valley, mistakenly assuming that the 49er Fire had damaged the towns even though it had never entered them.

Cause and legal proceedings

Apprehension 
A spokesperson for the Nevada County Sheriff's Department said deputies spotted Parris walking away from the abandoned house when they were en route to assist firefighters. A member of the Nevada County Sheriff's Department said he then found Parris 12 miles from the ignition point after witnesses advised him to look for a man with a bucket. Upon being found, Parris's first words were allegedly "I'm in trouble, aren't I?". That day, he was only cited for negligent burning, and remained free for two days until he was arrested and jailed on September 13 on charges of public intoxication.

Charges 
Though Parris originally faced a misdemeanor for the negligent burning, after meeting with Cal Fire officials Darlington upped the charges to a felony even as news reports raised doubts about Parris's possible mental health issues and level of responsibility for his actions. Parris was arraigned on September 15. Judge Edwards ordered Parris held in county jail on a $50,000 bail, prompted by Nevada County district attorney John Darlington, who argued in favor of the atypically large bail by citing Parris's past arrests for public intoxication and a concern for his safety. While Parris could have been held financially responsible for the fire, Darlington noted that it was a futile expectation, given that Parris had no money. On September 19, Parris pleaded not guilty to the charge of felony reckless burning. The case then went before the Nevada County Superior Court. Judge Ersel Edwards changed the charge from reckless burning of an inhabited structure to reckless burning of an uninhabited structure, after testimony that Parris's shack had not been fit for human habitation. 

The case was moved to the Sutter County Superior Court after Judge Edwards disqualified himself because he knew several fire victims, and there were fears that an impartial jury could not be formed in Nevada County because of the fire's widespread damage to local homes and property. In February 1989, Parris pled not guilty by reason of insanity to the two felony charges for reckless burning, as well as two misdemeanors. Testifying in his own defense, Parris admitted to hearing voices, among other phenomena, and said that the winds that had blown the burning paper into the brush had been the work of supernatural forces. Nevada County district attorney John Darlington argued that Parris had been sufficiently aware of his actions for his decision to burn the paper to qualify as reckless, though Parris's public defender argued otherwise.

Conviction and incarceration 
Parris was assaulted and injured while jailed and awaiting his conviction. In February 1989, a Sutter County Superior Court jury found Parris guilty of the two felony counts (reckless burning of a structure and reckless burning of forest land) and the two misdemeanor counts (negligently allowing a fire to burn out of control and burning property without permission of the owner). Shortly thereafter, he was found legally insane. Sutter County Superior Judge Timothy J. Evans declared that Parris would serve out the remainder of his sentence at Atascadero State Hospital, an all-male maximum-security psychiatric facility, also requiring that Parris's mental condition be re-evaluated after completing his sentence. Evans ruled that Parris's incarceration could be extended indefinitely by the court if he were still found to be a danger.

Some time after his conviction, Parris was diagnosed as a paranoid schizophrenic. Parris was released as an outpatient in 1995, but allegedly violated the terms of his release and was re-arrested in 1997 in Texas. In 1998, Sutter County Judge Robert Damron declared that Parris remained a threat, sentencing him to two more years at Atascadero. He was released in 2002.

See also 

 List of California wildfires
 Yellowstone fires (1988) - A simultaneous outbreak of wildfire complexes in and around Yellowstone National Park
 North Complex Fire (2020) - A massive wildfire driven by a similar 'inside slider' weather pattern in the northern Sierra
 River Fire (2021) - Another wind-driven and destructive wildfire in Nevada County

Notes

References 

Wildfires in Nevada County, California
1988 meteorology
September 1988 events in the United States
1980s wildfires in the United States
1988 in California
1988 natural disasters in the United States
1988 fires in the United States
Wildfires in Yuba County, California